Desak Sterixian, more commonly known as Desak the God Slayer, is a fictional character appearing in American comic books published by Marvel Comics. The character was created by Dan Jurgens and Tom Grummett and first appears in Thor Annual 2001. The character has been succeeded in his role as a killer of gods by the character Gorr the God Butcher, a more brutal character with a similar mission to kill gods, though the two are unrelated beyond this.

Fictional character history
Desak comes from an unnamed world where the inhabitants worship a god called Kronnitt. Kronnitt demands the sacrifice of Desak's daughter, and it was during the sacrifice that an apparition visits Desak and offers him a magic gem that will save his daughter. Desak thinks he is hallucinating, and refuses. When Kronnitt punishes Desak's people—despite the sacrifice—the apparition returns and this time Desak accepts the gem. Empowered by the gem, and equipped with a huge sword, axe, dagger and a shield, Desak then confronts and kills Kronnitt. His course of action clear, Desak travels from world to world and slays pantheon after pantheon of gods.

It is during a hunt for two gods called Pennsu and Tae. Desak encounters Thor, Beta Ray Bill, and Hercules. When Pennsu and Tae attempt to destroy their own people, the heroes intervene, giving Desak time to slay both of them. After a terse verbal encounter with Thor, Desak departs.

Desak eventually slaughters almost all of the Dark Gods—the Asgardians' old enemies—with the exception of Perrikus and Adva, who escape. Desak is then contacted by Zarrko the Tomorrow Man, who warns him of the threat that Thor, now Lord of Asgard after the death of Odin, poses to Earth. After easily dispatching the villain Grey Gargoyle, Desak fights and almost kills Thor. Having absorbed the Odinforce after a futile attack by Thor, Desak is about to kill Thor when a fellow Asgardian, Thialfi, provides Thor with the Bloodaxe, which Thor uses to kill Desak.

Unknown to Thor, the apparition rescues Desak and allows him to heal in hiding. Desak returns many years after a changed Thor has conquered the Earth, and kills many of Thor's closest Asgardian comrades. It is at this moment that the apparition is revealed to be Tarene, the Designate, who had traveled back in time to try to stop the future from occurring. Merging with the Destroyer, Desak becomes even more powerful, but now faces an enlightened Thor who realizes that his actions were wrong. Thor hurls his hammer Mjolnir with such force that it completely decapitates the Destroyer, killing Desak instantly.

Powers and abilities
Desak possessed superhuman strength, endurance, and his stone-like skin provided him with an extremely high resistance to injury. Desak had the ability to fly, teleport, shoot energy beams from his eyes, and survive indefinitely in the void of space. He could sense all aspects of godliness, immortality in an individual, and he was given power equal to any god. With his Amulet of Power, he could also absorb their life force into the gem, adding the defeated god's power to his own. It had not been revealed to what limit the amount of power Desak could attain. However, Desak had destroyed whole populations of gods single-handedly.

References

External links 

Characters created by Dan Jurgens
Fictional characters with superhuman durability or invulnerability
Comics characters introduced in 2001
Marvel Comics characters with superhuman strength
Marvel Comics supervillains
Thor (Marvel Comics)